Jules George Brennan (born 1911) was a Belgian born English boxer who competed for England.

Boxing career
Brennan won a gold medal in the light heavyweight division at the 1934 British Empire Games in London.

He defeated George Holton of Scotland in the final by knockout, after an eventful semi final bout against Robey Leibbrandt. Leibbrandt floored Brennan with a low blow during the fight and as Brennan rose he received a blow to the jaw. The referee consulted the judges and Leibbrandt was disqualified.

He won the Amateur Boxing Association 1933 and 1934 light heavyweight title, when boxing out of the Nottingham Police ABC. Following the success he turned professional and continued to fight up until 1946.

Personal life
He lived in Derbyshire and was a member of the Nottingham Police force.

References

External links
 

English male boxers
Commonwealth Games gold medallists for England
Year of death missing
1911 births
Commonwealth Games medallists in boxing
Boxers at the 1934 British Empire Games
Light-heavyweight boxers
20th-century English people
Medallists at the 1934 British Empire Games